Escherichia coli O157:H7 is a serotype of the bacterial species Escherichia coli and is one of the Shiga-like toxin–producing types of E. coli. It is a cause of disease, typically foodborne illness, through consumption of contaminated and raw food, including raw milk and undercooked ground beef. Infection with this type of pathogenic bacteria may lead to hemorrhagic diarrhea, and to kidney failure; these have been reported to cause the deaths of children younger than five years of age, of elderly patients, and of patients whose immune systems are otherwise compromised.

Transmission is via the fecal–oral route, and most illness has been through distribution of contaminated raw leaf green vegetables, undercooked meat and raw milk.

Signs and symptoms
E. coli O157:H7 infection often causes severe, acute hemorrhagic diarrhea (although nonhemorrhagic diarrhea is also possible) and abdominal cramps. Usually little or no fever is present, and the illness resolves in 5 to 10 days. It can also sometimes be asymptomatic.

In some people, particularly children under five years of age, persons whose immunologies are otherwise compromised, and the elderly, the infection can cause hemolytic–uremic syndrome (HUS), in which the red blood cells are destroyed and the kidneys fail. About 2–7% of infections lead to this complication. In the United States, HUS is the principal cause of acute kidney failure in children, and most cases of HUS are caused by E. coli O157:H7.

Bacteriology

Like the other strains of the species, O157:H7 is gram-negative and oxidase-negative. Unlike many other strains, it does not ferment sorbitol, which provides a basis for clinical laboratory differentiation of the strain. Strains of E. coli that express Shiga and Shiga-like toxins gained that ability via infection with a prophage containing the structural gene coding for the toxin, and nonproducing strains may become infected and produce shiga-like toxins after incubation with shiga toxin positive strains. The prophage responsible seems to have infected the strain's ancestors fairly recently, as viral particles have been observed to replicate in the host if it is stressed in some way (e.g. antibiotics).

All clinical isolates of E. coli O157:H7 possess the plasmid pO157.  The periplasmic catalase is encoded on pO157 and may enhance the virulence of the bacterium by providing additional oxidative protection when infecting the host. E. coli O157:H7 non-hemorrhagic strains are converted to hemorrhagic strains by lysogenic conversion after bacteriophage infection of non-hemorrhagic cells.

Natural habitat
While it is relatively uncommon, the E. coli serotype O157:H7 can naturally be found in the intestinal contents of some cattle, goats, and even sheep. The digestive tract of cattle lack the Shiga toxin receptor globotriaosylceramide, and thus, these can be asymptomatic carriers of the bacterium. The prevalence of E. coli O157:H7 in North American feedlot cattle herds ranges from 0 to 60%.
Some cattle may also be so-called "super-shedders" of the bacterium. Super-shedders may be defined as cattle exhibiting rectoanal junction colonization and excreting >103 to 4 CFU g−1 feces. Super-shedders have been found to constitute a small proportion of the cattle in a feedlot (<10%) but they may account for >90% of all E. coli O157:H7 excreted.

Transmission
Infection with E. coli O157:H7 can come from ingestion of contaminated food or water, or oral contact with contaminated surfaces. Examples of this can be undercooked ground beef but also leafy vegetables and raw milk. Fields often get contaminated with the bacterium through irrigation processes or contaminated water naturally entering the soil. It is highly virulent, with a low infectious dose: an inoculation of fewer than 10 to 100 CFU of E. coli O157:H7 is sufficient to cause infection, compared to over one-million CFU for other pathogenic E. coli strains.

Diagnosis
A stool culture can detect the bacterium, although it is not a routine test and so must be specifically requested. The sample is cultured on sorbitol-MacConkey (SMAC) agar, or the variant cefixime potassium tellurite sorbitol-MacConkey agar (CT-SMAC). On SMAC agar, O157:H7 colonies appear clear due to their inability to ferment sorbitol, while the colonies of the usual sorbitol-fermenting serotypes of E. coli appear red. Sorbitol nonfermenting colonies are tested for the somatic O157 antigen before being confirmed as E. coli O157:H7. Like all cultures, diagnosis is time-consuming with this method; swifter diagnosis is possible using quick E. coli DNA extraction method plus PCR techniques. Newer technologies using fluorescent and antibody detection are also under development.

Prevention
Proper hand washing after using the lavatory or changing a diaper, especially among children or those with diarrhea, reduces the risk of transmission. Anyone with a diarrheal illness should avoid swimming in public pools or lakes, sharing baths with others, and preparing food for others and even avoiding raw milk.

Surveillance
E. coli O157:H7 infection is a nationally reportable disease in the US, Great Britain, and Germany. It is also reportable in most states of Australia including Queensland.

Treatment
While fluid replacement and blood pressure support may be necessary to prevent death from dehydration, most patients recover without treatment in 5–10 days. There is no evidence that antibiotics improve the course of disease, and treatment with antibiotics may precipitate hemolytic–uremic syndrome. The antibiotics are thought to trigger prophage induction, and the prophages released by the dying bacteria infect other susceptible bacteria, converting them into toxin-producing forms. Antidiarrheal agents, such as loperamide (imodium), should also be avoided as they may prolong the duration of the infection.

Certain novel treatment strategies, such as the use of anti-induction strategies to prevent toxin production and the use of anti-Shiga toxin antibodies, have also been proposed.

History

United States
The U.S.D.A. banned the sale of ground beef contaminated with the O157:H7 strain in 1994.

Culture and society

Costs
The pathogen results in an estimated 2,100 hospitalizations annually in the United States. The illness is often misdiagnosed; therefore, expensive and invasive diagnostic procedures may be performed. Patients who develop HUS often require prolonged hospitalization, dialysis, and long-term followup.

See also 
 1993 Jack in the Box E. coli outbreak
 1996 Odwalla E. coli outbreak
 2011 Germany E. coli O104:H4 outbreak
 Escherichia coli O104:H4
 Escherichia coli O121
 Food-induced purpura
 List of foodborne illness outbreaks
 Walkerton E. coli outbreak

References

External links 

 Haemolytic Uraemic Syndrome Help (HUSH) – a UK based charity
 E. coli: Protecting yourself and your family from a sometimes deadly bacterium
 Escherichia coli O157:H7 genomes and related information at   PATRIC, a Bioinformatics Resource Center funded by   NIAID
 For more information about reducing your risk of foodborne illness, visit the US Department of Agriculture's Food Safety and Inspection Service website or the The Partnership for Food Safety Education | Fight BAC!
 briandeer.com, report from The Sunday Times on a UK outbreak, May 17, 1998
 CBS5 report on September 2006 outbreak

Escherichia coli
Bovine diseases
Zoonoses
Foodborne illnesses

bg:Escherichia coli O157:H7